"Close... But" is the fourth and final single from Echobelly's 1994 debut album, Everyone's Got One. It was released in October 1994. The song was included on the greatest hits album I Can't Imagine The World Without Me. The song was poorly received by AllMusic, who gave it 1.5 stars out of 5, and described it as "not one of the album's high points". It reached number 59 in the UK Singles Chart. A music video was made for the song.

Track listing

Notes
 Tracks 3 and 4 were recorded live on the Steve Lamacq Evening Session broadcast on 5 September 1994
 Tracks 2, 3 and 4 were re-released on the expanded edition of Everyone's Got One in 2014
 The 7-inch vinyl version only features tracks 1 and 2 (1 as the A-side, 2 as the B-side)
 The 12-inch vinyl version features tracks 1 and 2 on the A-side and tracks 3 and 4 on the B-side
 The 12-inch vinyl version comes with a poster, badge and sticker

Credits
 Bass – Alexander Keyser
 Drums – Andy Henderson 
 Guitar – Glenn Johansson, Debbie Smith
 Voice – Sonya Madan
 Saxophones (on track 1) – The Kick Horns
 Engineer – Miti Adhikari
 Track 1 Producer – Steven Street
 Track 2 Producer – Simon Vinestock
 Track 3 & 4 Producer – Sam Cunningham
 Cover photographer – Chris Craske

References

External links
 http://echobelly.com/music/singles-and-eps/close-but/
 https://www.discogs.com/Echobelly-CloseBut/release/1451612

1994 singles
1994 songs
Echobelly songs